Oectoperodes is a monotypic snout moth genus. Its only species, Oectoperodes rufitinctalis, was described by Émile Louis Ragonot in 1892. It is found in Brazil.

References

Moths described in 1892
Chrysauginae
Monotypic moth genera
Moths of South America
Pyralidae genera
Taxa named by Émile Louis Ragonot